Bolshevization was the process starting in the mid-1920s by which the pluralistic Communist International (Comintern) and its constituent communist parties were increasingly subject to pressure by the Kremlin in Moscow to follow Marxism–Leninism. The Comintern became a tool of Soviet foreign policy. That policy downplayed autonomy in favor of support for the Soviet Union and its foreign policy.

During the Fifth Congress of the Comintern in 1924, Bolshevization became the general principle. The Sixth Congress in 1928 took a radical turn as the Comintern decided that capitalism was reaching its final stages. There was less support for wars of national liberation in colonial regions, especially after the collapse of the Comintern in China.

In the Italian Communist Party, Antonio Gramsci took the lead in promoting Bolshevization. In Prague, it was Klement Gottwald who came to power in the Communist Party of Czechoslovakia by taking charge of Bolshevization.

See also 
 Communist International

Notes

Further reading 
 Degras, J. ed.  The Communist International 1919-1943, Documents: Volume I, 1919-1922; Volume II, 1923-1928; Volume III, 1929-1943 especially volume 2 (1971)

External links 
 "Comintern History Archive" at Marxists Internet Archive.

Comintern
Far-left politics
Foreign relations of the Soviet Union
Stalinism